Back From the Shadows was the twenty-fifth anniversary reunion tour of the comedy group the Firesign Theatre, performed at twenty cities across the United States in 1993. A live video CD recording of three performances was released as the group's nineteenth album in 1994 by Mobile Fidelity Sound Lab.

The performance material was loosely adapted and updated from four albums originally issued by Columbia Records: Waiting for the Electrician or Someone Like Him (1968); How Can You Be in Two Places at Once When You're Not Anywhere at All (1969); Don't Crush That Dwarf, Hand Me the Pliers (1970); and I Think We're All Bozos on This Bus (1971). The concert's title comes from lyrics "Back From the Shadows Again" that the group wrote as a parody of Gene Autry's signature song "Back in the Saddle Again" for I Think We're All Bozos on This Bus. The final scene, "Toad Away", is a parody hymn the group wrote to the tune of The First Noel in 1970 for their Dear Friends radio program, which appeared on the 1972 album of the same name.

Performance venues
The reunion concert opened in Seattle, Washington on April 24, 1993. The audience numbered 2,900 and included comic actor Harry Anderson. The tour continued through October, at US cities and venues including:
 Holbrook, Arizona ( Austin, Back From the Shadows liner notes)
 Denver, Colorado Auditorium Theatre
 Omaha, Nebraska
 Chicago, Illinois -- McCormick Place
 Erie, Pennsylvania
 Bennington, Vermont
 Rockland, Maine
 Springfield, Massachusetts -- University of Massachusetts Amherst
 Boston, Massachusetts -- Orpheum
 New York City -- Beacon Theatre
 Philadelphia, Pennsylvania -- Keswick Theatre
 Washington DC -- Warner Theatre
 New York City -- Paramount Theatre
 Somerset, Pennsylvania
 Galesburg, Illinois
 North Platte, Nebraska
 Salt Lake City, Utah
 Reno, Nevada
 Tiburon, California
 Los Angeles, California -- Wiltern Theatre

Track listing

References

1994 live albums
The Firesign Theatre albums
1990s comedy albums